Haworth is a village and tourist attraction in the English county of West Yorkshire, best known for its association with the Brontë sisters.

Haworth may also refer to:

Places
 Haworth, New Jersey, a borough
 Haworth, Oklahoma, a town
 Haworth Mesa, Antarctica
 Haworth (crater), on the Moon
 1824 Haworth, an asteroid

Businesses
 Haworth (company), an office furniture manufacturer headquartered in Holland, Michigan
 Haworth Press, publisher of scholarly, academic and trade books, and academic journals
 Haworth Art Gallery, Accrington, Lancashire, England
 Haworth Country Club, a private golf and country club in Haworth, New Jersey

Other uses
 Haworth (surname)
 Haworth baronets, a title in the Baronetage of the United Kingdom
 Haworth Watson (1880–1951), English cricketer
 Haworth projection, in chemistry
 Haworth's (novel by Frances Hodgson Burnett)

See also
 Haworthia, a genus of plants in the family Asphodelaceae, named after Adrian Hardy Haworth
 Hayworth
 Howarth